The FKI Tower also known by its full name Federation of Korean Industries Head Office Building is a skyscraper on Yeouido island in Seoul, South Korea. It was designed by the American architectural firm Adrian Smith + Gordon Gill Architecture. Construction started in 2010 and was completed in 2014. The building was awarded the 2015 Building of the Year award by American-architects.com

See also
List of tallest buildings in Seoul

References

External links
 

Yeouido
Office buildings completed in 2014
Landmarks in South Korea
Skyscraper office buildings in Seoul
2014 establishments in South Korea
Buildings and structures in Yeongdeungpo District